András Telek (born 10 December 1970) is a retired Hungarian football defender. Besides Hungary, he has played in China.

References

1970 births
Living people
Hungarian footballers
Ferencvárosi TC footballers
FC VSS Košice players
Yanbian Funde F.C. players
Zalaegerszegi TE players
Association football defenders
Hungarian expatriate footballers
Expatriate footballers in Slovakia
Hungarian expatriate sportspeople in Slovakia
Expatriate footballers in China
Hungarian expatriate sportspeople in China
Hungary international footballers
Hungarian football managers
Women's national association football team managers
Footballers from Budapest